This is a list of municipality numbers used in Norway.

The numbers originate from 1946, when four-digit codes based on ISO 3166-2:NO were assigned to each municipality. This also applied to municipalities which had ceased to exist at the time. Urban municipalities got a municipality number in which the third digit was a zero.

Note that this list is still needed for historical purposes, and will have to be copied to a new article prior to any change in numbering due to recent county reforms.

01 Østfold

02 Akershus

03 Oslo

04 Hedmark

05 Oppland

06 Buskerud

07 Vestfold

08 Telemark

09 Aust-Agder

10 Vest-Agder

11 Rogaland

12 Hordaland

13 Bergen

14 Sogn og Fjordane

15 Møre og Romsdal

16 Sør-Trøndelag

17 Nord-Trøndelag

18 Nordland

19 Troms

20 Finnmark

50 Trøndelag
On 1 January 2018, the counties of Nord-Trøndelag and Sør-Trøndelag were merged into a new county called Trøndelag.  This new arrangement meant that all municipalities would get new municipality numbers.

See also 
Municipalities of Norway, a list of present municipalities in Norway sorted by number.

References

Other

Norway
 
Municipalities